Mihai Taşcă is a historian and jurist from the Republic of Moldova.

Biography 
Mihai Taşcă is a doctor of law, senior researcher, Institute of History, State and Law of the Academy of Sciences of Moldova. Mihai Taşcă is the secretary of the Commission for the Study of the Communist Dictatorship in Moldova.

In 2006–2008, Taşcă won two cases concerning the denial of access to information opened against the Information and Security Service of the Republic of Moldova, which denied access to its archive.

On March 18, 2008 Mihai Taşcă submitted an application to the Ministry of Justice, seeking access to the files of the political parties; he intended to carry out a study about the election campaigns. On April 15, the Ministry rejected the application. After the second refusal, the researcher sued the Ministry to the Court of Appeal on June 17. On September 30, 2008, the court ordered that the Ministry of Justice offers Taşcă the files he asked for.

In 2001, he founded Revista de drept privat; now he is the editor in chief of this scientific magazine. He is also writing for daily Adevarul-Moldova, in a rubric called The Archives of Communism (once in two weeks, the other two materials per month being authored by historian Igor Caşu).

Works
 Mihail Taşcă, Sfatul Țării şi actualele autorităţi locale, "Timpul de dimineaţă", no. 114 (849), June 27, 2008 (page 16)

References

External links 
Ministry of Justice loses case on denial of access to information
Mihai Taşcă câştigă pentru a doua oară un proces împotriva SIS
Curtea Supremă de Justuţie: Accesul la dosarele Securităţii nu poate fi îngrădit
Mihai Taşcă, doctor în drept, cercetător ştiinţific superior, Institutul de Istorie, Stat şi Drept al AŞM
 Preşedintele interimar al Republicii Moldova Mihai Ghimpu a emis un decret prezidenţial privind constituirea Comisiei pentru studierea şi aprecierea regimului comunist totalitar din Republica Moldova.
Moldovan authorities going to condemn communist regime…
Hundreds of thousands of cases to be examined by commission for combating Communism
 http://www.privesc.eu/?p=1884 - The first press conference of the Commission, Moldpress, January 18, 2010. Video.
 https://web.archive.org/web/20100309165120/http://www.timpul.md/article/2010/01/18/5881 - interview with Gheorghe Cojocaru, president of the Commission.
 Vladimir Tismăneanu, Un moment istoric: Comisia de studiere a comunismului
 Site-ul Parlamentului Republicii Moldova

Living people
Moldova State University alumni
Moldovan jurists
Members of the Commission for the Study of the Communist Dictatorship in Moldova
Year of birth missing (living people)